Nubia is the term commonly used by scholars to refer to the land located south of Ancient Egypt, from the city of Elephantine down to modern-day Khartoum. Nubia has been one of the earliest humanly inhabited lands in the world. Its history is tied to that of Egypt, from which it became independent in the 10th century BC.  The rich gold deposits in Nubia made the latter the target of Ancient Egyptians, Greeks, Romans and later Arabs. Research on Nubia has allowed scholars to find several of its references.

Historical References to Nubia

Egyptians

Ancient Egyptians called the land down south from the first cataract of the Nile River Tanehsu. In Tanehsu, they called the land between the first and second cataracts, Wawat. William F. Albright's reconstruction of inscriptions in the Proto-Sinaitic script mention a WWT, which he believed was a reference to Wawat. That region was very rich in gold. Egyptians exploited it for almost three millennia. Napatans and Ptolemy II of Egypt exploited it as well.
During the Old Kingdom, the Egyptians called the land between the second and third cataracts Medja and its inhabitants the Medjay (Mazzoi in later Greek translation); however, by the Middle Kingdom "Medjay" referred to a group of desert nomads who wandered in and out of what used to be Medja, many of whom were employed as archers and/or in the Egyptian Army and eventually became an elite group of guardsmen; by the New Kingdom, the word essentially meant "police inspector."

The term Nubia came from Nortat, the name Egyptians used around the New Kingdom to refer to tribes living on their southern boundaries.

Greeks and Romans
Greeks occupied Egypt from the Ptolemaic Period (332-30BC), they called the land south of Egypt, Ethiopia. Romans adopted that name for Nubia when they came and defeated the Ptolemaic Dynasty.

Arabs and English
Arabs conquered Egypt in 641AD, and were planning to attack Bilad al-Sudan, the land of the blacks. That was the name Arabs used to refer to Nubia. That name was still used in 1820, when Mohammed Ali Pasha or Mehmet Ali became the viceroy of Egypt. When The English came and conquered the area, they adopted the name Sudan from the Arab term to refer to that area.

References

 El Mahdi, Mandour. 1965. A Short History of the Sudan. Pg 1–3. Oxford University Press.
 Shaw, Ian. 2000. The Oxford History of Ancient History. Oxford University Press.
 National Geographic. 2003. African adventure Atlas. National Geographic Maps
 Lobban Jr, Richard and Fluehr-Lobban, Carolyn and Kramer, Robert 2002 Historical Dictionary of the Sudan. African Historical Dictionaries. UK: The Scarecrow Press

 
Nubia